The 2018–19 NJIT Highlanders women's basketball team represents New Jersey Institute of Technology during the 2018–19 NCAA Division I women's basketball season. The Highlanders, led by first year head coach Mike Lane, play their home games at the Wellness and Events Center. They were fourth year members of the Atlantic Sun Conference. They finished the season 6–24, 3–13 in A-Sun play to finish in eighth place. They lost in the quarterfinals of A-Sun Tournament to Florida Gulf Coast.

Roster

Schedule

|-
!colspan=9 style=| Non-conference regular season

|-
!colspan=9 style=| Atlantic Sun regular season

|-
!colspan=9 style=| Atlantic Sun Women's Tournament

See also
2018–19 NJIT Highlanders men's basketball team

References

NJIT Highlanders
NJIT Highlanders women's basketball seasons
NJIT Highlanders Women's B
NJIT Highlanders Women's B